Tinav Ahmedov (born 31 March 1971) is a Russian judoka.

Achievements

See also
Judo in Russia

References

External links
 

1971 births
Living people
Russian male judoka
Place of birth missing (living people)
20th-century Russian people